Humbert II may refer to:

Humbert II of Savoy, Count of Savoy, 1080–1103
Humbert II of Viennois, Dauphin of the Viennois, 1333–1349
Umberto II of Italy, sometimes Humbert II, (1904–1983), of the House of Savoy, King of Italy